The 2018 North Alabama Lions football team represented the University of North Alabama during the 2018 NCAA Division I FCS football season. They were led by second-year head coach Chris Willis. The Lions played their home games at Braly Municipal Stadium and were competing as an FCS Independent. They finished the season 7–3.

Previous season

The Lions finished the season 5–5, 5–3 in Gulf South Conference (GSC) play to finish in a five-way tie for second place.

This was their final season as a member of the GSC and NCAA Division II as they will begin a transition to NCAA Division I and the Football Championship Subdivision where they will be a member of the Big South Conference in 2019 after playing 2018 as an FCS independent.

Schedule

Source:

Game summaries

at Southern Utah

at Alabama A&M

at North Dakota State

Azusa Pacific

at Campbell

West Florida

Mississippi College

at Jackson State

Shorter

North Greenville

Rankings

References

North Alabama
North Alabama Lions football seasons
North Alabama Lions football